The Netherlands Football League Championship 1900–1901 was contested by fifteen teams participating in two divisions. The national champion would be determined by a play-off match featuring the winners of the eastern and western football division of the Netherlands. HVV Den Haag won this year's championship by beating Victoria Wageningen 2–1 in a decision match.

New entrants
Eerste Klasse East:
Koninklijke UD returned after one season of absence

Eerste Klasse West:
Rapiditas Rotterdam returned after one season of absence
Velocitas

Divisions

Eerste Klasse East

Eerste Klasse West

Championship play-off

Replay

HVV Den Haag won the championship.

References
RSSSF Netherlands Football League Championships 1898-1954
RSSSF Eerste Klasse Oost
RSSSF Eerste Klasse West

Netherlands Football League Championship seasons
1900 in Dutch sport
1901 in Dutch sport